Athenaeus may refer to:

Athenaeus (officer), an officer of Antigonus I Monophthalmus in the Third War of the Diadochi who led a campaign against the Nabataeans in 312 BC
Athenaeus, son of Attalus I
Athenaeus (musician), Greek composer who flourished 128 BC
Athenaeus Mechanicus, a Peripatetic writer of the 1st century BC, author of On Machines
Athenaeus of Attalia, physician of the Pneumatist School who practiced at Rome in the 1st century AD
Athenaeus, of Naucratis in Egypt, Greek rhetorician and grammarian, 2nd and beginning of the 3rd century AD